Jan Stanisław Olbrycht (1886, Zahutyń –1968, Kraków) was a Polish medic, university professor and one of the most renowned specialists in forensics of the early 20th century. Throughout his life he served as a chief specialist in various trials, especially in the assessment of evidence. Between 1923 and his retirement in 1962 he was a professor at the Kraków-based Jagiellonian University. From 1931 he was also a member of the Polish Academy of Skills and from 1958 - of the Polish Academy of Sciences. Arrested by the Germans in 1942, he spent the rest of the war in Auschwitz and then Mauthausen-Gusen concentration camp.

Commander of the Order of Polonia Restituta (1952).

References 

1886 births
1968 deaths
20th-century Polish physicians
Auschwitz concentration camp survivors
Commanders of the Order of Polonia Restituta
Jagiellonian University alumni
Academic staff of Jagiellonian University
Mauthausen concentration camp survivors